Anastasia Kostaki (born March 26, 1978) is a former Greek professional basketball player, currently serving as an assistant coach for Panathinaikos. She is 1.72 m (5 ft 7 ¾) in height and 65 kg (144 pounds) in weight.

Biography
Kostaki started playing basketball at the age of nine and if she was not a basketball player she says she would have been a dancer or actress. She wants to work at the Greek Sports federation after retiring from basketball. She is the daughter of Konstantinos and Katerina and sister of Dimitra and Nikos. She became the first Greek player to play in the WNBA in 2006 when she played with the Houston Comets.

Her sports role model is Nikos Galis. Her favorite band is The Doors, but she also enjoys Greek music. Her favorite film is Beautiful Life and her favorite food is pasta and chicken. When not playing basketball, she enjoys reading, using the internet and going to movies.

Career pro club teams
 1990-1997:  D.A.S. Ano Liosion
 1997-1999:  A.C. Akademia 1975
 1999-2002:  Asteras Exarchion
 2002-2003:  Cavigal Nice Sports Basket
 2003-2004:  Delta Alessandria
 2004-2005:  ASD Basket Parma
 2005-2006:  Pays d'Aix Basket 13
 2006-2006:  Houston Comets (WNBA) [Summer 2006]
 2006-2006:  CSKA Samara
 2006-2007:  Dynamo Moscow Region
 2007-2007:  Dobrí anjeli Košice (only 2 games)
 2008-2009:  Panathinaikos
 2009–2013:  Dobrí anjeli Košice
 2014-2015:  Panathinaikos
 2015-2016:  Proteas Voulas

Greece national team history
1996 FIBA Europe Under-18 Championship for Women (qualifying round, challenge round and final round)
1999 FIBA European Championship (qualifying round and challenge round)
2001 FIBA European Championship (semi-final round, qualifying round and final round)
2003 FIBA European Championship (final round)
2004 Athens Olympics

Awards and accomplishments
2001-02 season: Third best scorer in the league (with 2 games missed), first in assists, first in fouls won (8 pg), first in free throws made and third in FT%, 6th in steals, etc.
2002-03: Named All-Star player and 1st team of preseason tournament.

References

External links

1978 births
Living people
Houston Comets players
Basketball players at the 2004 Summer Olympics
Greek women's basketball players
Olympic basketball players of Greece
Shooting guards
Panathinaikos WBC players
Basketball players from Athens